The John Gregovich House, at 101 Summit in Tonopah, Nevada, United States, is a historic house built in 1906 that is listed on the National Register of Historic Places.  Like the Zeb Kendall House, also built in Tonopah in 1906 and also NRHP-listed, it is of Neo-Colonial style.

It was deemed significant for its architecture and for its association with Tonopah merchant and member of the Nevada Senate John Gregovich, who built the house at about the time he established his business on Main Street.  The house was converted later to be used as a boarding house, in the 1920s.

It was listed on the National Register of Historic Places in 1982.

References 

Tonopah, Nevada
Houses in Nye County, Nevada
Houses completed in 1906
Houses on the National Register of Historic Places in Nevada
National Register of Historic Places in Tonopah, Nevada
1906 establishments in Nevada